Modern Life Is War is an American hardcore punk band formed in Marshalltown, Iowa, in 2002. During Modern Life Is War's six-year original run, the band released three full-length albums and one self-titled 7-inch EP. Despite a growing profile on the underground hardcore circuit, and garnering critical acclaim from numerous musical outlets, Modern Life Is War announced its dissolution in early 2008; however, the band reunited in 2012.

History
Modern Life Is War's self-titled 7-inch E.P. was released through Lifeline Records in early 2002. Its two subsequent studio albums, 2003's My Love. My Way. and 2005's Witness are now available through the Deathwish Inc. record label, which is owned and operated by Converge singer Jacob Bannon.

In mid-2005, after the release of Witness, guitarist Matt Hoffman and bassist Chris Honeck left the band. They were replaced by Sjarm 13 and Tim Churchman, respectively. On February 9, 2007, M.L.I.W. announced that it had inked a record deal with Equal Vision Records. The band's third full-length album, Midnight in America, was released on August 21, 2007, to positive reviews.

On February 19, 2008, the band announced on its Myspace page that it would be breaking up, and that it was planning one final American tour, starting March 29 in Milwaukee, Wisconsin, and reconvening on April 26 in the band's hometown of Marshalltown. In a separate interview conducted several weeks before the tour, the band members discussed their hopes and achievements in playing together for the last six years:"I hope that we have made some people feel less alone. I hope we have motivated people to think for themselves; to be themselves and to take action. Punk rock changed our lives, and I hope that we as a band contributed something to keep the whole thing going. We are leaving soon, but the future is unwritten..."

In September 2012, the original lineup reunited and wrote an album in John Eich's basement. Modern Life Is War formally announced its reunion in April 2013 and the intent to record and release the new album through Deathwish by September 2013. The band did not expect to heavily tour during the reunion; as of April 2013, Modern Life Is War was only booked to headline This Is Hardcore Festival and a record release show. Retrospectively, Modern Life Is War wished they had not broken up, but instead scaled back their efforts so they could do it, "without so much stress and life crushing commitment." The band released its fourth studio album Fever Hunting on September 9, 2013, through Deathwish, which was produced by Kurt Ballou of Converge. Modern Life Is War embarked on a six-date tour in celebration of the new album in October 2013.

To commemorate its 10th anniversary, Modern Life is War reissued a remastered version of their 2005 album Witness with updated packaging and liner notes on June 2, 2015, followed by a nine-date North American tour.

Members

Current
 Jeffrey Eaton – vocals
 John Paul Eich – guitar
 Bo Becker – guitar
 Chris Honeck – bass
 Luke Rauch – drums

Former
 Sjarm 13 (Harm Haverman) – guitar
 Tim Churchman – bass
 Brad Highnam – bass
 Matt Hoffman - guitar
 Tyler Oleson – drums

Discography
Studio albums
 My Love. My Way. (2003)
 Witness (2005)
 Midnight in America (2007)
 Fever Hunting (2013)

EPs
 Modern Life Is War (2002)
 Tribulation Work Songs vol 1 (2018)
 Tribulation Work Songs vol 2 (2018) 
 Tribulation Work Songs Vol 3 (2021)

Singles
 "Stagger Lee" (2007)

Music videos
 "Fuck the Sex Pistols" (2008)
 "Feels Like End Times" (2018) 
 "Survival" (2021)

References

External links
 Modern Life Is War on Punknews.org
 Jeffrey Eaton's personal blog
 Interview With Jeffrey Eaton on Late Night Wallflower
 Interview with Jeffrey Eaton few days before MLIW's last tour, on Dreamworld Realism blog
 Modern Life Is War Bandcamp Page

American post-hardcore musical groups
American hardcore punk groups
Melodic hardcore groups
Rock music groups from Iowa
Musical groups established in 2002
Musical groups disestablished in 2008
Equal Vision Records artists
Deathwish Inc. artists
People from Marshalltown, Iowa
Musical groups reestablished in 2012
2002 establishments in Iowa